SRFC may refer to:

Sacramento Republic FC
Sandridge Rovers F.C.
Saracens R.F.C.
Saxon Rovers F.C.
Seattle Reign FC
Shamrock Rovers F.C.
Sligo Rovers F.C.
Stade Rennais F.C.
Stafford Rangers F.C.
Stanway Rovers F.C.
Super Reds FC
Suttonians R.F.C.
Swansea R.F.C.